Ignacio Miramón (born 12 June 2003) is an Argentine professional footballer who plays as an attacking midfielder for Gimnasia La Plata.

Career
Miramón left Balonpié de Bolívar to join Gimnasia y Esgrima in 2019. He was promoted into their first-team for pre-season training in August 2020 by manager Diego Maradona. He made his unofficial bow in a friendly with San Lorenzo on 30 September 2020. Having featured further in pre-season, Miramón made the competitive bench on eight occasions during the 2020 Copa de la Liga Profesional. After going unused on matchday one of the 2021 Copa de la Liga Profesional against Boca Juniors, Miramón made his senior debut on 19 February 2021 during a win over Talleres; he replaced Eric Ramírez with eighteen minutes left.

Personal life
Miramón comes from a footballing family. His great-grandfather (Cholo Azpiroz), grandfather (“Perro” Miramón), father (Emilio Miramón), uncle (Guillermo Panaro) and cousins (Agustín and Manuel Panaro) all played in the Argentine pyramid. On 19 December 2020, it was announced that Miramón had tested positive for COVID-19 amid the pandemic; he was asymptomatic.

Career statistics
.

Notes

References

External links

2003 births
Living people
Sportspeople from Buenos Aires Province
Argentine footballers
Association football midfielders
Argentine Primera División players
Club de Gimnasia y Esgrima La Plata footballers